Jad Prachinak (born August 5, 1981) is a baseball coach and former pitcher, who is the current head baseball coach of the North Alabama Lions. He played college baseball at Rhode Island from 2001 to 2004. He served as the head coach of the West Chester Golden Rams (2012–2020).

Playing career
Prachniak grew up in Lincoln, Rhode Island, where he attended Lincoln High School, where he was a letterwinner for the Lions in baseball. Prachniak would go on to pitch for the Rams, bouncing back and forth between the rotation and bullpen. He made 14 starts for the Rams, pitching to a 4–5 win–loss record with a 6.04 earned run average.

Coaching career
Prachniak began his coaching career immediately following his playing career. He served as a volunteer assistant for Rhode Island as well as the pitching coach for The Prout School, while finishing up his degree in 2005. When Rhode Island head coach, Frank Leoni took the head coaching job at William & Mary, he brough Prachniak with him as the Tribe's pitching coach. On June 30, 2011, Prachniak was named the head coach of the West Chester Golden Rams. Prachniak lead the Golden Rams to a National Championship season, in just his first year. The Golden Rams would become champions again in 2017. On December 4, 2020, Prachniak stepped down as the head coach of the Golden Rams to take an assistant coaching position on the Delaware Fightin' Blue Hens staff.

On June 23, 2022, Prachniak was named the head coach of the North Alabama Lions.

Head coaching record

References

External links
North Alabama bio

1981 births
Living people
Delaware Fightin' Blue Hens baseball coaches
North Alabama Lions baseball coaches
Rhode Island Rams baseball players
West Chester Golden Rams baseball coaches
William & Mary Tribe baseball coaches